Ada is a 2019 Canadian short film based on the late life of Ada Lovelace, made for the Crazy8s film competition in Vancouver. It is directed by Steven Kammerer and stars Julie Bruns as Ada Lovelace. The cast includes Hanneke Talbot, John Emmet Tracy, Matthew Kevin Anderson, and Jim Byrnes (actor).

References

External links 

 Official Facebook page

Canadian biographical drama films
2019 short films
2019 films
Canadian drama short films
2010s Canadian films